Davidsen may refer to:

 Davidsen (name)
 Ida Davidsen, a restaurant in Copenhagen, Denmark
 M. Davidsen (ship), an Icelandic ship

See also
 Davidson (disambiguation)